HD 202206 is a binary star system in the southern constellation of Capricornus. With an apparent visual magnitude of +8.1, it is too faint to be visible to the naked eye. It is located at a distance of 150 light years from the Sun based on parallax, and is drifting further away with a radial velocity of +14.7 km/s.

The primary component is a G-type main-sequence star with a stellar classification of G6V, indicating it is generating energy through core hydrogen fusion. It is an estimated three billion years old and is spinning with a projected rotational velocity of 2.3 km/s. It is a metal-rich star – what astronomers term the abundance of elements of higher atomic number than helium – which may explain the star's unusually high luminosity for its class. The star has a slightly greater mass and radius compared to the Sun.


Companions 

In 2000, analysis of radial velocity measurements of the star revealed the existence of a brown dwarf companion with at least 17 times the mass of Jupiter around the star in an eccentric orbit with a period of around 256 days. Even after the brown dwarf was accounted for, the star still showed a drift in the radial velocity measurements, suggesting another companion in a longer-period orbit. In 2004 after further observations, the parameters of a proposed companion was announced.

Further observation of this system revised this picture in 2017, showing that the system instead consisted of a pair of co-orbiting stars being viewed nearly face-on, with the pair being orbited in turn by a Super-Jupiter designated HD 202206 c. The secondary stellar companion, now designated component B rather than 'b', is a red dwarf star with 8.9% of the mass of the Sun.

See also 

 PSR B1620-26

References

External links 
HD 202206  on Extrasolar Planets Encyclopaedia
 Extrasolar Planet Interactions by Rory Barnes & Richard Greenberg, Lunar and Planetary Lab, University of Arizona

G-type main-sequence stars
M-type main-sequence stars
Brown dwarfs
Capricornus (constellation)
Durchmusterung objects
202206
104903